New Picnic Time is the third album by American rock band Pere Ubu. It was released in September 1979 by Chrysalis Records. Reportedly the album sessions were stressful and contentious, and after touring, the group disbanded.  They would reform a matter of months later, with Mayo Thompson replacing founding guitarist Tom Herman. The lyrics for the song "The Voice of the Sand" are based upon the poetry of Vachel Lindsay.

The album was reissued in 1989 on CD by Rough Trade Records, in 1999 on CD by Thirsty Ear Records, in 2008 on CD on Cooking Vinyl.

On the 1989 Rough Trade CD, the song "Jehovah's Kingdom Comes!" was re-titled "Hand A Face A Feeling" (a phrase from the lyrics). For subsequent reissues the song was remixed, removing all references to Jehovah, and re-re-titled "Kingdom Come". On the 2017 Fire Records reissues (and the 2016 box set Architecture of Language 1979 - 1982) the song was edited, removing approximately twenty-five seconds of music. The title of the opening track "Have Shoes Will Walk (The Fabulous Sequel)" has also varied from release to release.

Track listing
All songs written by Pere Ubu (David Thomas, Tom Herman, Tony Maimone, Allen Ravenstine and Scott Krauss).
"Have Shoes Will Walk (The Fabulous Sequel)" – 3:16
"49 Guitars & One Girl" – 2:51
"A Small Dark Cloud" – 5:49
"Small Was Fast" – 3:39
"All the Dogs Are Barking" – 3:03
"One Less Worry" – 3:46
"Make Hay" – 4:03
"Goodbye" – 5:18
"The Voice of the Sand" – 1:28 (lyrics based on a poem by Vachel Lindsay)
"Jehovah's Kingdom Comes!" – 3:17

Personnel
Pere Ubu
David Thomas – vocals, organ
Tom Herman – guitar, bass guitar, organ
Tony Maimone – bass guitar, guitar, piano
Allen Ravenstine – EML synthesizers, saxophone
Scott Krauss – drums

Technical
Pere Ubu – production
Ken Hamann – production, engineering, mixing
Paul Hamann – engineering
John Thompson - design

References

External links

Pere Ubu albums
1979 albums
Chrysalis Records albums
Rough Trade Records albums
Cooking Vinyl albums
Fire Records (UK) albums